Bella with White Collar (Bella au col blanc) is a painting done by Belarusian-French artist Marc Chagall in 1917. It is a portrait of Bella Rosenfeld Chagall, Chagall's wife at the time. The two tiny figures at the bottom are thought to represent the artist and the couple's daughter, Ida. The painting is currently kept at the Centre Pompidou in Paris.

References

Paintings by Marc Chagall
1917 paintings